Ray Darnell McDavid (born July 20, 1971) is an American former professional baseball outfielder. He played for the San Diego Padres of Major League Baseball (MLB) from 1994 to 1995.

He was considered one of the top prospects in baseball in 1992, 1993 and 1994. In his first two years playing in the Padres' minor league system in 1991 and 1992, he drew 200 bases on balls and stole 103 bases.

External links

1971 births
Living people
American expatriate baseball players in Canada
Arizona League Padres players
Arizona Western Matadors baseball players
Baseball players from San Diego
Charleston Rainbows players
Gulf Coast Expos players
High Desert Mavericks players
Las Vegas Stars (baseball) players
Major League Baseball outfielders
Ottawa Lynx players
San Diego Padres players
West Palm Beach Expos players
Wichita Wranglers players